Pitstone (formerly Pightelsthorn, with possible variation Pychelesthorn in 1399) is a village and civil parish in east Buckinghamshire, England. It directly adjoins the village of Ivinghoe, and the two villages share some facilities.

History
The village name is Anglo-Saxon in origin, and means 'Picel's thorn tree'. It was recorded in the Domesday Book of 1086 as Pincelestorne.

Pitstone was given to the abbey at Ashridge by the Earl of Cornwall in 1283.  In 1290 King Edward I spent Christmas in Pitstone at the estate that had been given to the abbey, and stayed for five weeks, during which time he held parliament in Ashridge.  His stay caused great inconvenience to the local inhabitants of the village who were legally obliged to keep the king and his court.

It was described in a Victorian gazetteer by John Marius Wilson as "7 miles in length and 1 in breadth. Post-town, Tring. Acres, 2,836 [] Real property, £3,692. Pop., 581. Houses, 109. The property is divided among a few.".  Its area dropped between 1851 and 1891 from the said number acres to 1,644.  The number of houses rose most steeply in the 1950s, from 169 to 252.

Landmarks and neighbourhoods

Its Castlemead area of  housing and business units was named after Castle Cement Company which was the last owner of the Pitstone cement works, which operated from 1937 to 1991.

The area around St Mary's Church is known as Church End.

A notable building is Pitstone Windmill, which is owned by the National Trust. The windmill was formerly capable of rotating to face the prevailing wind, as evidenced by the wheel protruding from one side of the structure. Although it no longer can do so, the wheel remains and its pivot point is clearly visible.

Pitstone Green Museum provides working insights into agricultural history and various supporting trades. The museum is to the south of the village proper on a farm.

Pitstone Hill, above the village, is a Site of Special Scientific Interest (SSSI), designated for its botanical interest.  The hill is crossed by the Ridgeway National Trail. A former chalk quarry has been converted to College Lake nature reserve, a flagship reserve of the Berkshire, Buckinghamshire and Oxfordshire Wildlife Trust, and the area east of the lake within the nature reserve is a geological SSSI, Pitstone Quarry.

Geography
The elongated civil parish is semi-urban in the extreme west north-west (WNW) and is otherwise rural and elevated, rising to the opposite direction.  Approximately following the north-west border is the Grand Union Canal.  Its population rose in the ten years to 1961 from 544 to 766.

Sport and leisure 
Pitstone has a Non-League football team Pitstone & Ivinghoe United F.C. who play at The Recreation Ground on Vicarage Road.

Pitstone is the home of internationally acclaimed cyclist, Nick Clarke who holds the record for the RRA "Side to Side" record of Pembroke to Great Yarmouth.

See also
St Mary's Church, Pitstone

References

External links

 Pitstone Green Museum
 Village Website
 The Benefice of St.Mary’s includes the villages of Ivinghoe, Pitstone, Slapton, Horton and Ivinghoe Aston
 Family and local history index - GENUKI

 
Villages in Buckinghamshire
Civil parishes in Buckinghamshire